Howsham railway station can refer to:
Howsham railway station (Lincolnshire)
Howsham railway station (North Yorkshire)